The Swin River is a river of the Canterbury region of New Zealand's South Island. It flows southwest from the Taylor Range to reach the southeastern shore of Lake Heron.

See also
List of rivers of New Zealand

References

Rivers of Canterbury, New Zealand
Rivers of New Zealand